Marcus was an influential Manichaean missionary in Spain in the 4th century AD.

References

4th-century Romans
Manichaeans
Missionaries

Gnostics